Hyperspace, also known as Gremloids, is a 1984 3D science fiction comedy film starring Chris Elliott and Paula Poundstone, written and directed by Todd Durham and filmed in Shelby, North Carolina. This was the sixth and final 3-D film produced by the Owensby Studios in the 1980s.

The film was an early parody of the 1977 space opera film, Star Wars. It introduced Lord Buckethead, the visage of whom later became a satirical perennial candidate at British elections.

Plot
A Star Wars-style text crawl explains how a resistance force led by Princess Serina has stolen vital radio transmissions from an evil Galactic Alliance. The Darth Vader-like villain, Lord Buckethead (named only in the closing credits), pursues Serina, but, due to an error in navigation, instead lands on Earth.

Lord Buckethead then leads his Jawa-like minions into the nearby suburb while none-the-wiser of his blunder. He immediately mistakes town folk such as Chester, the local baker, for a galactic hero called Captain Starfighter; and again later Karen, an employee at a local transmission repair shop, for Princess Serina, promptly abducting her for interrogation.

Max, a timid exterminator with sights on passing an upcoming exam and being promoted to an executive, unintentionally arrives on the scene and helps Karen escape. The two flee into the woods, but are soon captured and taken back to the aliens' ship.

While there, the minions eventually discover they are on the wrong planet. But due to Lord Buckethead's arrogance, any attempt to inform him is viewed as insubordination and dealt with harshly by execution.

Max and Karen soon escape again and, after a run around in a superstore, finally arrive just in time for him to take his big exam. Lord Buckethead then arrives, takes Karen captive and demands the radio transmissions he still seeks be handed over. Otherwise, the town will be destroyed.

The military arrives but is easily pushed back by the spaceship's superior defenses. Max meanwhile takes the opportunity to sneak aboard and rescue Karen. The two make it off just as the ship is preparing for lift-off. Lord Buckethead's minions meanwhile have had all they can take from his arrogance and bullying abuse, and literally kick him off the ship as he stands on the main boarding ramp, marooning him on Earth.

He then pursues and corners Max and Karen, but is killed by Chester, who appears in a Superman style outfit, revealing that he actually is Captain Starfighter. The film finally ends with the alien spaceship flying away from Earth.

Cast
 Chris Elliott as William Hopper
 Paula Poundstone as Karen
 Alan Marx as Max
 Robert Bloodworth as Lord Buckethead
 R.C. Nanney as Chester

Production
Comedy actor Chris Elliott was cast in the lead role while he was still appearing in the television show Late Night with David Letterman.

Hyperspace was originally to be distributed by MGM, although the release did not go ahead. It was released in the UK under the title Gremloids.

Legacy

The Gremloids Party is a fictitious political party that has run a candidate called Lord Buckethead in three of the United Kingdom general elections. The candidate is shown wearing a bucket-like mask on his head. Buckethead ran against Margaret Thatcher for parliament in Finchley in 1987, against John Major in Huntingdon in 1992, and against Theresa May in Maidenhead in 2017, the last of which he received 249 (0.4%) votes in the constituency.

References

External links
 
 Gremloids at British Board of Film Classification

1984 3D films
1984 films
1984 comedy films
1980s American films
1980s English-language films
1980s science fiction comedy films
Films scored by Don Davis (composer)
Films set on fictional planets
Parody films based on Star Wars